Aquabacterium olei is a Gram-negative, non-spore-forming and motile bacterium of the genus Aquabacterium which has been isolated from oil-contaminated soil in Korea. Aquabacterium olei can degrade oil.

References

External links
Type strain of Aquabacterium olei at BacDive -  the Bacterial Diversity Metadatabase

Comamonadaceae
Bacteria described in 2015